Jean-Louis André Théodore Géricault (26 September 1791 – 26 January 1824) was a French painter and lithographer, whose best-known painting is The Raft of the Medusa. Although he died young, he was one of the pioneers of the Romantic movement.

Early life
Born in Rouen, France, Géricault was educated in the tradition of English sporting art by Carle Vernet and classical figure composition by Pierre-Narcisse Guérin, a rigorous classicist who disapproved of his student's impulsive temperament while recognizing his talent. Géricault soon left the classroom, choosing to study at the Louvre, where from 1810 to 1815 he copied paintings by Rubens, Titian, Velázquez and Rembrandt.

During this period at the Louvre he discovered a vitality he found lacking in the prevailing school of Neoclassicism. Much of his time was spent in Versailles, where he found the stables of the palace open to him, and where he gained his knowledge of the anatomy and action of horses.

Success

Géricault's first major work, The Charging Chasseur, exhibited at the Paris Salon of 1812, revealed the influence of the style of Rubens and an interest in the depiction of contemporary subject matter.  This youthful success, ambitious and monumental, was followed by a change in direction: for the next several years Géricault produced a series of small studies of horses and cavalrymen.

He exhibited Wounded Cuirassier at the Salon in 1814, a work more labored and less well received. Géricault in a fit of disappointment entered the army and served for a time in the garrison of Versailles. In the nearly two years that followed the 1814 Salon, he also underwent a self-imposed study of figure construction and composition, all the while evidencing a personal predilection for drama and expressive force.

A trip to Florence, Rome, and Naples (1816–17), prompted in part by the desire to flee from a romantic entanglement with his aunt, ignited a fascination with Michelangelo. Rome itself inspired the preparation of a monumental canvas, the Race of the Barberi Horses, a work of epic composition and abstracted theme that promised to be "entirely without parallel in its time". However, Géricault never completed the painting and returned to France.

The Raft of the Medusa

Géricault continually returned to the military themes of his early paintings, and the series of lithographs he undertook on military subjects after his return from Italy are considered some of the earliest masterworks in that medium.  Perhaps his most significant, and certainly most ambitious work, is The Raft of the Medusa (1818–19), which depicted the aftermath of a contemporary French shipwreck, Meduse, in which the captain had left the crew and passengers to die.

The incident became a national scandal, and Géricault's dramatic interpretation presented a contemporary tragedy on a monumental scale. The painting's notoriety stemmed from its indictment of a corrupt establishment, but it also dramatized a more eternal theme, that of man's struggle with nature. It surely excited the imagination of the young Eugène Delacroix, who posed for one of the dying figures.

The classical depiction of the figures and structure of the composition stand in contrast to the turbulence of the subject, so that the painting constitutes an important bridge between neo-classicism and romanticism. It fuses many influences: the Last Judgment of Michelangelo, the monumental approach to contemporary events by Antoine-Jean Gros, figure groupings by Henry Fuseli, and possibly the painting Watson and the Shark by John Singleton Copley.

The painting ignited political controversy when first exhibited at the Paris Salon of 1819; it then traveled to England in 1820, accompanied by Géricault himself, where it received much praise.

While in London, Géricault witnessed urban poverty, made drawings of his impressions, and published lithographs based on these observations which were free of sentimentality. He associated much there with Charlet, the lithographer and caricaturist. In 1821, while still in England, he painted The Derby of Epsom.

Later life

After his return to France in 1821, Géricault was inspired to paint a series of ten portraits of the insane, the patients of a friend, Dr. Étienne-Jean Georget, a pioneer in psychiatric medicine, with each subject exhibiting a different affliction. There are five remaining portraits from the series, including Insane Woman.

The paintings are noteworthy for their bravura style, expressive realism, and for their documenting of the psychological discomfort of individuals, made all the more poignant by the history of insanity in Géricault's family, as well as the artist's own fragile mental health. His observations of the human subject were not confined to the living, for some remarkable still-lifes—painted studies of severed heads and limbs—have also been ascribed to the artist.

Géricault's last efforts were directed toward preliminary studies for several epic compositions, including the Opening of the Doors of the Spanish Inquisition and the African Slave Trade. The preparatory drawings suggest works of great ambition, but Géricault's waning health intervened. Weakened by riding accidents and chronic tubercular infection, Géricault died in Paris in 1824 after a long period of suffering. His bronze figure reclines, brush in hand, on his tomb at Père Lachaise Cemetery in Paris, above a low-relief panel of The Raft of the Medusa.

Works

Les Monomanes (Portraits of the Insane)

References

Works Cited

Further reading
 (see index)

External links
 
 
 The Zurich Sketchbook by Théodore Géricault
 

1791 births
1824 deaths
École des Beaux-Arts alumni
Burials at Père Lachaise Cemetery
Deaths by horse-riding accident in France
French male painters
French romantic painters
French people of Norman descent
French printmakers
Orientalist painters
Artists from Rouen
Lycée Louis-le-Grand alumni
19th-century French painters
Romantic painters
19th-century French male artists